The Sydney Electric Train Society is a railway preservation society in Sydney, Australia. It specialises in NSW electric traction and particularly NSW electric locomotives.

History
The Sydney Electric Train Society (SETS) was established in 1991. In January 1992, it operated its first tour with single deck stock across the CityRail suburban network, the last of which were about to be withdrawn.

On 20 April 1998, SETS purchased 46 class electric locomotive 4615. Later in 1998, it purchased four Tulloch power cars from the State Rail Authority along with some U set stock. It has since expanded its collection with 85 and 86 class locomotives, one Bradfield and two Suburban power cars acquired from RailCorp and the only complete Sydney Monorail set.

SETS rolling stock has at various times been on static display at various public railway museums; Lithgow State Mine Heritage Park & Railway, the Goulburn Rail Heritage Centre and Junee Roundhouse Railway Museum. From 2003 to 2009, SETS operational electric locos and interurbaban cars were housed at Hornsby Maintenance Depot. Having had all of its rollingstock stored away from the electrified network (at Junee) since 2009, in June 2018, 4615, 8606, CF5003 and CF5021 were transferred to Lithgow with 8606 returned to service to haul infrastructure trains on the Sydney Trains underground network.

Collection

Electric Locomotives

Electric Multiple Units

Monorail

Publication
The society publishes Under the Wires, a bi-monthly magazine.

References

Heritage railway companies of Australia
1991 establishments in Australia